Results breakdown of the 2015 Spanish local elections may refer to:

Results breakdown of the 2015 Spanish local elections (Andalusia)
Results breakdown of the 2015 Spanish local elections (Aragon)
Results breakdown of the 2015 Spanish local elections (Asturias)
Results breakdown of the 2015 Spanish local elections (Balearic Islands)
Results breakdown of the 2015 Spanish local elections (Basque Country)
Results breakdown of the 2015 Spanish local elections (Canary Islands)
Results breakdown of the 2015 Spanish local elections (Cantabria)
Results breakdown of the 2015 Spanish local elections (Castile and León)
Results breakdown of the 2015 Spanish local elections (Castilla–La Mancha)
Results breakdown of the 2015 Spanish local elections (Catalonia)
Results breakdown of the 2015 Spanish local elections (La Rioja)
Results breakdown of the 2015 Spanish local elections (Community of Madrid)
Results breakdown of the 2015 Spanish local elections (Galicia)
Results breakdown of the 2015 Spanish local elections (Navarre)
Results breakdown of the 2015 Spanish local elections (Region of Murcia)
Results breakdown of the 2015 Spanish local elections (Valencian Community)

2015 municipal elections in Spain
2015